In the siege of Jadotville  in September 1961, a small contingent of the Irish Army's 35th Battalion, designated "A" Company, serving as part of the United Nations Operation in the Congo (Opération des Nations Unies au Congo, ONUC) were besieged in the mining town of Jadotville (modern-day Likasi) by Katangese forces loyal to the secessionist State of Katanga. The siege took place during the seven-day escalation of a stand-off between ONUC and Katangese forces during Operation Morthor. Although the contingent of 155 Irish soldiers repelled attacks by a 3,000-man Katangese force for five days while an undersized relief force of Irish, Indian and Swedish troops attempted to reach them, they were eventually forced to surrender having run out of ammunition and water.  "A" Company was subsequently held as prisoners of war for approximately one month. The Irish forces inflicted approximately 1,300 casualties (including up to 300 killed) on the Congolese force, with no deaths amongst "A" Company.

Background
On Wednesday 13 September 1961, United Nations forces in Katanga launched a military offensive, that was code-named Operation Morthor, against mercenary military units serving the State of Katanga, which had seceded from Congo-Léopoldville in July 1960. According to its mandate, the United Nations Operation in the Congo (ONUC) forces were to remain impartial in the conflict. But the Katangese political leadership believed the UN had broken its mandate and its forces were siding with their opponent, the Congolese central government. Soon after the start of Morthor, the Katangese led a counterattack on an isolated unit of Irish UN soldiers based in the mining town of Jadotville, approximately 100 kilometers from the main UN base in Elisabethville. The Irish unit, consisting of 155 men, designated "A" Company, commanded by Commandant Pat Quinlan, were ordered to the mining town some weeks earlier to assist in the protection of its citizens; this was a result of the Belgian foreign minister calling the UN secretary-general to report that Belgian settlers and the local population feared for their safety.

Due to anti-UN and pro-Katangese elements, the troops were not universally welcomed. Two previous companies of ONUC peacekeepers — one Swedish and one Irish — had been withdrawn from Jadotville in the days prior to "A" Company's arrival. While it is not clear why the Katangese wanted to isolate the Irish UN troops, some commentators have suggested that the goal may have been to take the Irish as prisoners for leverage in negotiations with the UN.

Battle
At 07:40 on the morning of Wednesday 13 September 1961, the Katangese attacked while many of the UN Irish troops of A Company were attending an open-air mass. Expecting to take the men off guard, the first attackers moved in rapidly but were spotted by an Irish sentry. A warning shot by Private Billy Ready alerted the company to the threat (Ready was wounded in a later exchange of fire).

The paramilitary Katangese Gendarmerie, which was a combined force of mercenaries, Belgian settlers and local tribesmen, attacked the Irish. The attackers had a strength of 3,000–5,000 men, mostly Katangese and settlers, but with many Belgian, French and Rhodesian mercenaries armed with a mix of weapons and could call on limited air support from a Fouga Magister trainer-light ground attack jet fitted with a pair of underwing bombs and twin 7.5 mm machine guns. The aircraft attacked several times. The Irish soldiers were armed with personal weapons, a number of water-cooled Vickers machine guns, 60mm mortars and two Irish-built Ford Mark VI armoured cars.

The Katangese attacked in waves of 600 or so, preceded by bombardment from 81 mm mortars and a French 75mm field gun. The Irish Support Platoon of A Company knocked out most of the Katangese mortar and artillery positions, including the 75mm gun, with counter-battery fire from 60mm mortars. The fire from the UN Irish positions proved accurate and effective. Mercenary officers were reportedly observed shooting native gendarmes to stem the rout caused in Katangese lines.

The 500 Irish and Swedish UN troops based in Kamina, and Indian army Gurkhas (seemingly 3rd Battalion, 1 Gorkha Rifles) made several attempts to relieve the besieged Irish soldiers. The supporting force of mercenaries, many of them French, German, Belgian and South African, of whom almost all were veterans of the Algerian War, beat back these efforts. They had been brought in by Moïse Tshombe, Katanga's premier, whose secessionist government had been supported by Belgium.

Attempting to reach the besieged A Company, the relief column was stymied in a series of battles at a pinch point called the Lufira Bridge. It carried the Jadotville-to-Elisabethville Highway across the Lufira River. The Katangese forces dug in here and brought heavy and sustained ground and air fire onto the relief column, killing three Indian UN troops, injuring a number of Irish UN troops and ultimately forcing the column off the bridge.

A number of days later, the besieged Irish radioed to their headquarters: "We will hold out until our last bullet is spent. Could do with some whiskey".  The Katangese asked Quinlan for a cease-fire, as their own forces had been seriously diminished. By this time their effective strength may have been reduced to 2,000 men. Quinlan agreed.  A Company, 35th Battalion, suffered five wounded in action during the siege. The Katangese suffered up to 300 killed, including 30 mercenaries and an indeterminate number of wounded, with figures ranging from 300 to 1,000.

At one stage in the conflict, a mission to bring in water by air was successful, but due to the use of contaminated containers (previously used to store petrol), the water was largely undrinkable. Quinlan lacked any clear direction or communication from his superiors, and the Katangese gradually infringed on the cease-fire agreement to undermine "A" Company's position. With his position untenable, without any clear orders or promise of assistance, having run out of ammunition and food and low on water, Quinlan accepted the second offer to surrender to the Katangese on the afternoon of Sunday 17 September. The Irish soldiers were held as hostages for approximately one month, in an effort to extort terms of ceasefire that were embarrassing to the United Nations. The Katangese and their mercenary allies bartered the Irish soldiers for prisoners in the custody of the Congolese government of Joseph Kasa-Vubu. After being released, the troops were returned to their base in Elisabethville. Some weeks later, however, "A" Company found itself involved in active combat again, this time with the support of Swedish UN troops. Eventually, they were reinforced with fresh troops from Ireland (their replacement was the 36th Battalion). After weeks of fighting and their six-month tour of duty now complete, "A" Company was rotated out of the battle zone and were home in Ireland that December.

Aftermath

In January 1963, UNOC'S  Operation Grandslam decisively defeated the forces of the self proclaimed State of Katanga, reintegrating the region into the Congo, while "President" Tshombe fled the country. The various failures of the UNOC mission during 1961, including the assassination of Prime Minister Patrice Lumumba and the death toll of Operation Morthor, led elements of the UN to downplay attention to the Siege of Jadotville.

Until the early 21st century, the Irish state did not give much recognition to the battle of Jadotville either. The term "Jadotville Jack" was sometimes applied as a term of derision about the Irish Defence Forces. After the incident no Irish soldier received any decoration for his actions at Jadotville, although Quinlan recommended a number of his men for the Military Medal for Gallantry (MMG), Ireland's highest award for military valour, for their actions during the battle. In 2016 the Irish government awarded a Presidential Unit Citation to "A" Company, the first in the State's history.

Although "A" Company, 35th Battalion had tactically defeated a larger enemy force at Jadotville, the Irish Defence Forces' leadership did not overtly acknowledge the battle. There may have been perceived shame that "A" Company had surrendered, or because of political and strategic errors demonstrated at higher levels.

According to RTÉ, "Commandant Quinlan's action is cited in military textbooks worldwide as the best example of the use of the so-called perimeter defence".

The veterans of Jadotville were dissatisfied that the Defence Forces refused to acknowledge the battle and that there was an implied black mark on the reputation of their commander. A number of Irish soldiers, who had been involved in the siege, reputedly took their own lives in later years. Quinlan, who died in 1997, had his public reputation restored nine years after his death. John Gorman, a retired soldier who had been a 17-year-old private during the fight, campaigned to have the Battle of Jadotville recognised. In 2004 Irish Minister for Defence Willie O'Dea agreed to hold a full review of the battle. A Defence Forces inquiry cleared Quinlan and "A" Company of allegations of soldierly misconduct. A commemorative stone recognising the soldiers of "A" Company was erected on the grounds of Custume Barracks in Athlone in 2005. A commissioned portrait of Quinlan was installed in the Congo Room of the Irish Defence Forces' UN School.

In October 2017 a plaque commemorating Quinlan was unveiled in his native County Kerry, by former Taoiseach Enda Kenny. The decision of the state to honour the soldiers of Jadotville or their next of kin was one of the last decisions taken by Enda Kenny before he retired as Taoiseach in June 2017. They were presented with special medals in Athlone on 2 December 2017.

In popular culture
Declan Power's history, The Siege at Jadotville: The Irish Army's Forgotten Battle (2005), was adapted as the film, The Siege of Jadotville (2016). The cast includes Jamie Dornan and Mark Strong, and the movie had a "well received" premiere at the 2016 Galway Film Festival. It had a limited cinematic release in September 2016, and worldwide release on Netflix, on 7 October 2016. A radio documentary on the siege was broadcast on RTÉ Radio 1 in 2004.

Footnotes

References

Notes

Sources

Further reading
 
 
 
 
 
 Erik Kennes, Miles Larmer, The Katangese Gendarmes and War in Central Africa: Fighting Their Way Home, Indiana University Press, 2016

External links
 Battle of Jadotville Anniversary, exhibition of contemporary documents from the Irish Military Archives

Conflicts in 1961
Sieges involving Ireland
Sieges involving Sweden
Military operations involving India
1960s in the Democratic Republic of the Congo
Mercenary warfare
United Nations operations in the Democratic Republic of the Congo
Likasi
Congo Crisis
State of Katanga
September 1961 events in Africa
Sieges post-1945
Military history of the Republic of Ireland